The 173rd Ohio Infantry Regiment, sometimes 173rd Ohio Volunteer Infantry (or 173rd OVI) was an infantry regiment in the Union Army during the American Civil War.

Service
The 173rd Ohio Infantry was organized in Gallipolis, Ohio, and mustered in for one year service on September 18, 1864, under the command of Colonel John R. Hurd.

The regiment was attached to Post and Defenses of Nashville, Tennessee, Department of the Cumberland, to March 1865. 3rd Sub-District, District of Middle Tennessee, Department of the Cumberland, to June 1865.

The 173rd Ohio Infantry mustered out of service July 12, 1865, at Nashville, Tennessee, and was discharged at Camp Dennison near Cincinnati, Ohio, on July 5, 1865.

Detailed service
Left Ohio for Nashville, Tenn., September 18, arriving there October 1. Assigned to guard duty at Nashville, Tenn., until February 1865. Occupation of Nashville during Hood's investment December 1–15, 1864. Battle of Nashville December 15–16. Guarding prisoners at Nashville until February 1865. Moved to Columbia, Tenn., February 15. Duty there and at Johnsonville until June 20. Moved to Nashville June 20, and there mustered out June 26. Disbanded at Camp Dennison, Ohio, July 5, 1865.

Casualties
The regiment lost a total of 108 enlisted men during service, all due to disease.

Commanders
 Colonel John Ricker Hurd

See also

 List of Ohio Civil War units
 Ohio in the Civil War

References
 Dyer, Frederick H. A Compendium of the War of the Rebellion (Des Moines, IA:  Dyer Pub. Co.), 1908.
 Ohio Roster Commission. Official Roster of the Soldiers of the State of Ohio in the War on the Rebellion, 1861–1865, Compiled Under the Direction of the Roster Commission (Akron, OH: Werner Co.), 1886–1895.
 Reid, Whitelaw. Ohio in the War: Her Statesmen, Her Generals, and Soldiers (Cincinnati, OH: Moore, Wilstach, & Baldwin), 1868. 
Attribution

External links
 Ohio in the Civil War: 173rd Ohio Volunteer Infantry by Larry Stevens
 Regimental flag of the 173rd Ohio Infantry
 Rosters of the 173rd Ohio Infantry

Military units and formations established in 1864
Military units and formations disestablished in 1865
Units and formations of the Union Army from Ohio
1864 establishments in Ohio